The Swan 55 was designed by Sparkman & Stephens and built by Nautor's Swan and first launched in 1969.

References

External links
 http://www.nautorswan.com Nautor Swan
 http://www.classicswan.org

Sailing yachts
Keelboats
1970s sailboat type designs
Sailboat types built by Nautor Swan
Sailboat type designs by Olin Stephens
Sailboat type designs by Sparkman and Stephens